Gigena is a surname. Notable people with the surname include:

Darío Alberto Gigena (born 1978), Argentine footballer
Facundo Gigena (born 1994), Argentine rugby union player
Mario Gigena (born 1977), Italian basketball player
Rubén Darío Gigena (born 1980), Argentine footballer